Anton van Dale (Anthonie, Antonius) (8 November 1638, in Haarlem – 28 November 1708) was a Dutch Mennonite preacher, physician and writer on religious subjects, described by the contemporary theologian Jean Le Clerc as an enemy of superstition. He was a critic of witch-hunting.

His De oraculis veterum ethnicorum dissertationes (1683) was an influential work on oracles, which he argued against the supernatural and the role of the Devil in the pagan oracular tradition. In this he was followed two decades later by Fontenelle, who wrote his Histoire des oracles as an adaptation and popularized version of van Dale's work.

Works
De oraculis veterum ethnicorum dissertationes (1683)
Dissertationes de origine ac progressu Idolatriae et Superstitionum, de vera ac falsa Prophetia, uti et de Divinationibus Idolatricis Judaeorum (1696)
Commentatio super Aristeam de LXX interpretibus (1705)
Dissertatio super Aristea de LXX interpretibus (1705)

Notes

References

External links
Global Anabaptist Mennonite Encyclopedia Online

1638 births
1708 deaths
Dutch Mennonites
Dutch male writers
Mennonite ministers
People from Haarlem
17th-century Anabaptist ministers
Mennonite theologians
Mennonite writers